is a third-sector railway company in Chiba Prefecture, Japan. It operates Japan's shortest independent railway line, the 2.2 km Shibayama Railway Line between Higashi-Narita Station and Shibayama-Chiyoda Station, largely underneath Narita International Airport.

Narita International Airport Corporation owns a 68.39% majority stake in Shibayama Railway as of July 2009. The remainder is owned by Keisei Electric Railway, Japan Airlines, the prefectural government, and others.

Stations and operation 
Although the Shibayama Railway is an independent operator, it functionally resembles an extension of the Keisei Electric Railway; the line is operated using equipment and crews leased from Keisei, and Shibayama-Chiyoda Station is designed to resemble a Keisei station. Most Shibayama Railway trains provide local service to Keisei Narita Station past Higashi-Narita; a few local trains run through to Keisei Ueno Station, and express trains operate during rush hours through the Keisei Line and Toei Asakusa Line to terminate at Nishi-Magome Station, or at Haneda Airport Station on the Keikyū Airport Line. The 92.8 km Haneda run goes through tracks of 6 different rail lines and requires coordination among 4 operators, namely, Shibayama, Keisei Main, Keisei Oshiage, Toei Asakusa, Keikyū Main, and finally Keikyū Airport Line.

The adult fare between Higashi-Narita and Shibayama-Chiyoda is 190 yen.

History
Shibayama Railway was founded on May 5, 1981, and received an operating permit on June 24, 1988 to use dedicated small train sets between the current Shibayama-Chiyoda Station site and a temporary station adjacent to Higashi-Narita Station. In 1990, the railway applied for a permit to operate through service with the Keisei Railway from Keisei Narita Station; construction of a through link was approved in 1996, and the line opened for operation on October 22, 2002.

The construction of the railway was strongly demanded by Shibayama residents, and was supported by the Transport Ministry and Narita Airport Authority in order to appease residents of the area immediately east of Narita International Airport, as the airport property cut off Shibayaman's access to Narita City and points west.

There are some proposals to extend the line beyond Shibayama-Chiyoda in the future. The Ministry of Land, Infrastructure and Transport has recommended studying an extension into central Shibayama Town.

Location

References

External links 
 Company website (in Japanese)

Railway lines in Japan
Railway companies of Japan
Airport rail links in Japan
Standard gauge railways in Japan
Railway lines opened in 2002
Companies based in Chiba Prefecture
2002 establishments in Japan
Keisei Electric Railway
Japanese third-sector railway lines

ko:시바야마 철도 시바야마 철도선